"Straight Up" is a single by American singer-songwriter Chanté Moore, released in August 2000. It was written by R&B singer Lil' Mo and produced by Jermaine Dupri. The song served as the lead single for Chanté Moore's fourth album, Exposed (2000). "Straight Up" reached number 83 on the US Billboard Hot 100, number 22 on the Billboard Hot R&B/Hip-Hop Singles & Tracks, and number 11 on the UK Singles Chart. A music video directed by Bille Woodruff was created for the song.

Track listings

US maxi-CD single
 "Straight Up" (radio edit) – 3:45
 "Straight Up"  (Sunship remix vocal) – 5:27
 "Straight Up"  (Junior's remix) – 7:55

US 12-inch single
A1. "Straight Up" (radio edit) – 3:42
A2. "Straight Up" (instrumental) – 3:42
B1. "Straight Up" (extended mix) – 5:32
B2. "Straight Up" (acappella) – 3:42

UK and Australian CD single
 "Straight Up" (radio edit) – 3:45
 "Straight Up" (Sunship remix vocal/main mix) – 5:27
 "Straight Up" (Junior's remix) – 7:55
 "Straight Up" (video)

UK 12-inch single
A1. "Straight Up" (Sunship remix vocal) – 5:27
B1. "Straight Up" (Junior's remix) – 7:55
B2. "Straight Up" (radio edit) – 3:45

UK cassette single
 "Straight Up" (radio edit) – 3:45
 "Straight Up" (Sunship remix vocal) – 5:27

European CD single
 "Straight Up" (radio edit) – 3:45
 "Straight Up" (Sunship main mix) – 5:27

French CD single
 "Straight Up" (radio edit) – 3:45
 "Straight Up" (extended mix) – 5:34
 "Train of Thought" – 3:51

Charts

Weekly charts

Year-end charts

Release history

References

2000 singles
2000 songs
Chanté Moore songs
MCA Records singles
Music videos directed by Bille Woodruff
Silas Records singles
Song recordings produced by Jermaine Dupri
Songs written by Bryan-Michael Cox
Songs written by Jermaine Dupri
Songs written by Lil' Mo